Hayley Nichole Williams (born December 27, 1988) is an American singer and songwriter, who is best known as the lead vocalist, primary songwriter, and keyboardist of the rock band Paramore.
 
Born and raised in Mississippi, Williams moved to Franklin, Tennessee, at the age of 13 in 2002 to escape her stepfather at the time. In 2004, she formed Paramore alongside Josh Farro, Zac Farro, and Jeremy Davis. The band currently consists of Hayley Williams, Zac Farro and Taylor York. The band has released six studio albums: All We Know Is Falling (2005), Riot! (2007), Brand New Eyes (2009), Paramore (2013), After Laughter (2017), and This Is Why (2023).

Williams released her debut solo single, "Simmer", on January 22, 2020, and announced on the same day that her debut studio album, Petals for Armor, would be released on May 8, 2020. The album was preceded by two EPs entitled Petals for Armor I and II that make up the first two-thirds of the album. Her second solo record, Flowers for Vases / Descansos, was released less than a year later on February 5, 2021.

Aside from Paramore and preceding her solo career, Williams recorded the song "Teenagers" for the soundtrack of Jennifer's Body (2009) and has collaborated with artists such as October Fall, The Chariot, Set Your Goals, Zedd and New Found Glory. In 2010, she was featured on the single "Airplanes" by B.o.B. It peaked at number two on the U.S. Billboard Hot 100. A sequel to the song, "Airplanes, Part II", features new verses from B.o.B. and a verse from Eminem, while Williams' vocals remain the same. This collaboration led to a Grammy nomination for Best Pop Collaboration with Vocals.

Other ventures in which Williams has explored include online beauty and music series Kiss-Off on Popular TV launched in 2015 and the hair-dye company Good Dye Young, launched in 2016.

Early life 
Hayley Nichole Williams was born in Meridian, Mississippi, on December 27, 1988, the daughter of Joey and Cristi Williams. She has two younger half-sisters. 

After her parents' divorce in 2002, Williams moved with her mother to Franklin, Tennessee. She met future bandmates Josh and Zac Farro at her new school. Shortly after settling in Franklin, she began taking vocal lessons with Brett Manning. While still at school, she tried out for a local funk cover band, The Factory, where she met Jeremy Davis. Williams' childhood neighbor was NBA player Rodney Hood.

Music career 
Williams was discovered in 2003 by managers Dave Steunebrink and Richard Williams, who signed the 14-year-old to a two-year production deal. At the time she was writing pop songs with songwriters in Nashville. Williams was introduced to Atlantic Records A&R Tom Storms through Richard Williams' attorneys Jim Zumwalt and Kent Marcus, and then signed to the label by Jason Flom. The label's original plan for their new artist was to make her a solo pop artist, but Williams objected to this, saying that she wanted to be part of a band and play pop punk music.

Atlantic decided to go along with her wishes, and she then formed Paramore with Josh Farro, Zac Farro, and Jeremy Davis. The music of Paramore was originally supposed to come out on Atlantic Records, but the label's marketing department decided it would be better for the image of the band to not have them attached to a huge label. They instead released their music through a "cooler" niche label, Fueled by Ramen. According to Williams, the name "Paramore" came from the maiden name of the mother of one of their first bass players. Once the group learned the meaning of the homophone "paramour" ("secret lover"), they decided to adopt the name, using the Paramore spelling. The band's debut album, All We Know Is Falling, was released in 2005 when Hayley was only 16 years old. Paramore has since released four more studio albums, Riot! (2007), Brand New Eyes (2009), the self-titled Paramore (2013) and After Laughter (2017). In June 2009, the band welcomed Taylor York (rhythm guitar) as an official member, although he had already been playing as a touring member with the band since 2007. In December 2010, Josh and Zac Farro left the band. The news was posted by Williams on Paramore's website, with Josh later posting a blog post confirming their departure, calling the group "a manufactured product of a major label, riding on the coattails of 'Hayley's dream'".

In 2006, Paramore toured outside of the US for the first time, which included a headline tour of the UK and supporting post-hardcore rock band The Blackout on the Give It A Name Festival in Europe. The following year, she and the rest of Paramore made an appearance in the music video for "Kiss Me" by New Found Glory. In the 2007 Kerrang! Readers' Poll, she finished second to Evanescence's Amy Lee in the "Sexiest Female" category, going on to win the first place spot for "Sexiest Female" a year later in the 2008 poll, and again in the 2009, 2010, 2011 and 2012 poll. She also appears as a playable character in the video game Guitar Hero World Tour after completing "Misery Business" in the vocalist campaign.

Williams wrote and recorded the song "Teenagers", which was featured in the soundtrack for the feature film Jennifer's Body. After the release of "Teenagers", Williams stated that she had no plans to establish herself as a solo artist. In 2010, she appeared on the tracks "Airplanes" and "Airplanes, Part II" from alternative rapper B.o.B's debut album, B.o.B Presents: The Adventures of Bobby Ray. When it was released as a single, "Airplanes" peaked within the top ten in nineteen countries, including the number one position in the United Kingdom and New Zealand.

EDM producer Zedd and Williams collaborated on the track "Stay the Night", from his debut studio album, Clarity, which was released in 2013. Williams was honored with the "Trailblazer Award" in the 2014 Billboard'''s Women in Music Awards for making a unique mark in music and paving the way for other artists. In 2015, Williams starred as the 'Crimson Curse' in Taylor Swift's music video for her single, "Bad Blood", alongside sixteen other celebrities. Along with band member and co-writer Taylor York, Williams was nominated for and won the Grammy Award for Best Rock Song at the 2015 ceremony for the song "Ain't It Fun". In July 2015, Williams won the APMA for Best Vocalist. In 2019, she collaborated with American Football on the song "Uncomfortably Numb", which appeared on the band's third self-titled studio album.

In a 2019 interview with l'Odet, Williams was asked 'if she would stay in Paramore for a long time,' and answered: "In moving forward, if the three of us are happy, then we will just do whatever we want to do. If that means collaborating with each other, bringing other friends in to collaborate — there are seven band members when we tour. We’re all friends and we all make music in different parts, together. So I feel like, yes, I want to be in Paramore...I’ve been in a band with them since I was 12; I don’t think the band is going anywhere. As long as we’re friends, the band just is. It’s just in us." 

In December 2019, on her 31st birthday, Williams announced she would be releasing solo music in 2020, with a "taste" of it to come in January. Flyers consisting of a picture of Williams under the title Petals for Armor began appearing in several US cities and abroad. Her debut solo single "Simmer" was released on January 22, 2020, with its accompanying music video. That same day Williams announced that her debut studio album, Petals for Armor, would be released on May 8, 2020. It was later revealed that she would release an EP, Petals for Armor I, on February 6, 2020, in an interview with Zane Lowe on Apple Music. On March 19, she announced that she was postponing the release of the second half of the EP, and instead released the song "Roses/Lotus/Violet/Iris" featuring boygenius.

In January 2021, Williams started teasing a project titled Flowers for Vases / Descansos. She unofficially released the single "My Limb" by giving a CD with the track on it to a dedicated fan. Williams released the album on February 5, 2021.

 Endorsements 

In March 2013, Williams announced she was partnering with MAC Cosmetics for the release of a new makeup collection on April 9, 2013. The four-piece collection included a bright orange lipstick, an orange nail polish, a shimmery coral eye shadow and a beauty powder. Hayley appeared on the April 2013 cover of Nylon magazine to promote Paramore's self-titled album.

In October of that year, Williams partnered with the Hard Rock Café's PINKTOBER charity campaign to raise awareness and funding for breast cancer and its research.

In 2015, she launched the online beauty and music series Kiss-Off on Popular TV.

In 2016, after over four years of planning, Williams launched her own hair dye company, Good Dye Young, alongside her hair and makeup artist, Brian O'Connor. The colors offered by the company included an orange, Riot!; a pink, Ex-Girl; a blue, Blue Ruin; a yellow, Steal My Sunshine; a red, Rock Lobster; a purple, PPL Eater; a green, Kowabunga; a teal, Narwhal; and a black, None More Black. The dyes are vegan and cruelty-free.

In 2017, Good Dye Young launched a temporary hair dye line, that disappears after one wash, called Poser Paste, and in May 2020, they released Lighter Daze, a range of five semi-permanent pastel colors.

In November 2020, Williams released a candle in collaboration with home fragrance brand Apothekeco.

In March 2021, Williams announced her collaboration with Tea Huntress, a tea manufacturer in Nashville. Two new blends are available as part of the collaboration, called Bloom and Alibi. A portion of each sale will be donated to Thistle Farms, an organization that helps women survivors of trafficking, abuse, and addiction.

 Personal life 
Throughout much of her life Williams has identified as a Christian and regularly discusses her faith in relation to her music. In the past she has criticized the judgmental nature of some in the Christian community. The Farro brothers cited differing attitudes on faith as contributing to their exit from Paramore.
In late 2007, Williams began dating Chad Gilbert, lead guitarist of New Found Glory. They became engaged on Christmas Day 2014. They were married on February 20, 2016. On July 1, 2017, the couple formally announced that they had separated and their pending divorce was eventually finalized by the end of 2017, during Paramore's touring cycle for After Laughter. The divorce was a result of Gilbert's infidelity. In September 2022, Williams confirmed she and Paramore bandmate Taylor York are dating. 

Williams had publicized her decisions against such practices as smoking, drinking, or use of recreational drugs when she was younger; she has revealed that she now drinks alcohol. 

Williams has been vocal about her experiences with depression, which caused her to briefly leave Paramore in mid-2015. In a 2019 interview, she openly discussed depression, mental health, and her divorce. In a February 2020 interview, she revealed she had suicidal thoughts, but that she ultimately did not act on them. In a February 2021 interview, she discussed how she had been impacted by generational trauma and revealed that she has been in therapy since the conclusion of Paramore's After Laughter tour in 2018. In a February 2023 interview, she revealed that she had been diagnosed with PTSD in 2018. 

In 2015, Williams responded to feminist criticism of "Misery Business" – a single from Paramore's album Riot! – citing her youth and inexperience as a contributing factor to the song's allegedly misogynistic lyrics. In a blog post addressing the criticism, Williams described herself as "a proud feminist. Just maybe not a perfect one". In June 2020, Williams temporarily handed control of her Instagram account to Nashville-based activist group Teens4Equality to highlight their work in relation to the Black Lives Matter movement.

In October 2021, Williams announced that she would be discontinuing her use of personal social media accounts, citing the need for boundaries between her public and private life and her desire to "spend more time looking up and out, rather than down". She also directed her fans to follow Paramore's social media accounts instead. This choice does not affect Paramore's use of social media.

In November 2022, Williams endorsed Beto O'Rourke in the 2022 Texas gubernatorial election.

 Artistry 

 Influences 
Williams cites artists and band as main influences such as Björk,  NSYNC, Jimmy Eat World, Saves the Day, mewithoutYou, Radiohead, The Cure, Talking Heads, Fleetwood Mac, No Doubt, Slick Shoes, The Chariot, Now, Now, New Found Glory, Fireworks, Set Your Goals, Tegan and Sara, H2O, Lemuria and The Swellers. She has noted her admiration for such female singers as Christina Aguilera, Debbie Harry, Emily Haines, Siouxsie Sioux, Gwen Stefani, Beyoncé, and Brody Dalle of The Distillers.

 Voice 
Williams is a soprano with a four-octave range. Emilee Lindner of MTV News has noted her ability to sing in the whistle register, and Maura Johnston of Rolling Stone her "acrobatic" singing style. Thrills also notes Williams's slight country twang in some of her songs. Alternative Press'' wrote that Williams "has more charisma than singers twice her age, and her band aren't far behind in their chops, either." Singer-songwriter John Mayer praised Williams's voice in an October 2007 blog post, calling her "The great orange hope" (her hair being orange at the time).

Discography

Studio albums

Extended plays

Singles

As lead artist

As featured artist

Other charted songs

Other appearances

Guest appearances

Notes

Filmography

Podcast host

Awards and nominations

References

External links 

 Hayley William's  Profile on Paramore.net

1988 births
21st-century American singers
American child singers
American sopranos
American women pop singers
American women singer-songwriters
American indie pop musicians
American acoustic guitarists
American pop guitarists
American pop rock singers
American women rock singers 
American rock songwriters
Child pop musicians
Grammy Award winners
Singers with a four-octave vocal range
Living people
Pop punk singers
Singer-songwriters from Mississippi
Singer-songwriters from Tennessee
NME Awards winners
Paramore members
People from Franklin, Tennessee
Musicians from Meridian, Mississippi
American multi-instrumentalists
21st-century American women singers
American Christians
Feminist musicians
Women punk rock singers